Society Doctor is a 1935 American drama film directed by George B. Seitz and starring Robert Taylor, Chester Morris, and Virginia Bruce. It was produced and distributed by Metro-Goldwyn-Mayer. It was inspired by an unproduced play by Theodore Reeves.

Synopsis
In a hospital two doctors compete romantically for their colleague Madge Wilson, a nurse. When Doctor Morgan them is fired for taking an ethical stand in conflict yo his superior's tendency to indulge his wealthy clients, he decides to accept an offer to set up a private practice catering to high society. This offends Madge who sees him as being motivated by greed rather than principle and agrees to marry his friend Doctor Ellis even though she is in love with Morgan.

Reception
According to MGM records the film earned $331,000 in the US and Canada and $203,000 elsewhere, making a profit of $187,000.

Cast

 Chester Morris as Dr. Bill Morgan
 Robert Taylor as Dr. Tommy 'Sprout' Ellis
 Virginia Bruce as 	Madge Wilson
 Billie Burke as Mrs. Crane
 Raymond Walburn as 	Dr. Horace Waverly
 Henry Kolker as Dr. Harvey
 Dorothy Peterson as Mrs. Kate Harrigan
 William Henry as Frank Snowden
 Mary Jo Mathews as Mary Roberts 
 Robert McWade as 	Harris Snowden
 Donald Meek as 	Moxley
 Louise Henry as Telephone Operator Gail
 Johnny Hines as 	Hardy
 Addison Richards as Pete Harrigan
 Bobby Watson as Albright
 Arthur Vinton as Butch McCarthy 
 James Flavin as Detective Ewing
 Wade Boteler as 	Detective Grady 
 Eulalie Jensen as 	Mother McCarthy 
 Heinie Conklin as 	Oscar Horsemeyer 
 Inez Palange as 	Mrs. Esposito 
 Richard Tucker as McKenzie
 Libby Taylor as 	Mercedes, Mrs. Crane's Maid 
 Isabelle Keith as 	Nurse 
 Lee Shumway as 	Doctor
 Jean Chatburn as 	Receptionist

References

External links
Society Doctor at TCMDB

1935 films
Metro-Goldwyn-Mayer films
1935 drama films
American drama films
American black-and-white films
Films directed by George B. Seitz
1930s English-language films
1930s American films